The Robert S. Vessey House, on College Avenue in Wessington Springs, South Dakota, was built in 1906.  It was listed on the National Register of Historic Places in 1978.

It is a two-story Dutch Colonial-style house, with three dormers above its front porch, built on a somewhat terraced corner lot.

It was home of Robert S. Vessey, who became governor of the state.  The house was deemed significant in architecture and government: "Architecturally its Swedish-Dutch Colonial appearance makes it one of the better examples of every twentieth century architecture in Wessington Springs. Politically the structure is important for it housed Vessey when he was elected governor in 1908."

Notes

References

External links

Houses on the National Register of Historic Places in South Dakota
Houses completed in 1906
Jerauld County, South Dakota
1906 establishments in South Dakota